Table Top Mountain is a mountain located in Essex County in the U.S. State of New York. 
Table Top Mtn. is flanked to the north by Phelps Mountain, and to the south by Mount Marcy.

Table Top Mountain stands within the watershed of the Ausable River, which drains into Lake Champlain, thence into Canada's Richelieu River, the Saint Lawrence River, and into the Gulf of Saint Lawrence.
The southwest end of Table Top Mtn. drains into Marcy Brook, and the West Branch of the Ausable River.
The northwest side of Table Top Mtn. drains into Phelps Brook, thence into Marcy Brook.
The north end of Table Top drains into Klondike Brook, thence into the Ausable's West Branch.
The southeast side of Table Top drains into Johns Brook, thence into the East Branch of the Ausable River.

Table Top Mountain is within the High Peaks Wilderness Area of the Adirondack State Park.

See also 
 Table Top Mountain
 List of mountains in New York
 Northeast 111 4,000-footers
 Adirondack High Peaks
 Adirondack Forty-Sixers

Notes

External links 
 
 
 

Mountains of Essex County, New York
Adirondack High Peaks
Mountains of New York (state)